Poggenpohl is a German manufacturer specialized in kitchen cabinets. Its facilities are located in Herford, Germany.

History

In 1892, Poggenpohl was established as a furniture company founded by Freidemir Poggenpohl. Poggenpohl was successful with introducing ergonomic work-top heights, and storage innovations aimed at improving the kitchen. In 1923, Poggenpohl introduced a free-standing commodious cupboard called The Ideal, which was also adopted by American cabinet manufacturer Kitchen Maid. The Poggenpohl cupboard was the forerunner of The Fitted Kitchen in the "Era of the Commodious Cupboard". The company continued to create new products and techniques; in 1928, it introduced the reform kitchen, a significant innovation in the industry, and in 1930, it created the 'ten-layer polished lacquer technique'. 

In 1950, Poggenpohl launched the first unit kitchen, which has become the kitchen industry standard. These kitchens, created in response to what Poggenpohl saw as a desire for the modern in its customer base, offered a continuous counter-top workspace and wall units that matched. As the product line evolved, they replaced the traditional wooden knob handles of the cabinetry with inset "strip" laminate handles.

In 1970, Poggenpohl authorised its first dealer in the United States, in Barrington, NJ. AV Kitchens (or AV Poggenpohl Studio) directly imported kitchens from Poggenpohl for more than two decades under the auspices of dealer president Stephen Rabinowitz, in cooperation with Poggenpohl  Chief Executive Walter Ludewig. In 1986, Poggenpohl USA is formed in Allandale, NJ as an arm of the manufacturer in the United States, intended to facilitate communications and logistics of U.S.-based orders into German manufacturing facilities.

In 2004, Poggenpohl introduced the first technology kitchen with entertainment and smart home technology, and in 2007, Poggenpohl introduced the first product brand kitchen with Porsche Design implementing the P'7340 - Porsche Design Kitchen.

In December, 2016 Swedish Nobia came to an agreement with German Adcuram Group on the sale of Poggenpohl. In 2020, the Jomoo Group took over Poggenpohl.

References

External links

 
 Kitchen & Bathroom Cabinets
 Brand Rating by Wirtschaftswoche
 German Brands of the Century by Publisher Dr. Florian Langenscheidt

Kitchen manufacturers
Manufacturing companies established in 1892
Furniture companies of Germany
German brands
Companies based in North Rhine-Westphalia
1892 establishments in Germany